is a railway station in Minamiuonuma, Niigata, Japan, operated by the East Japan Railway Company (JR East).

Lines
Urasa Station is a station on the Joetsu Shinkansen high-speed line and also the Joetsu Line.

Station layout
The station has  a two island platforms serving the local Joetsu Line and two elevated opposed side platforms serving the Joetsu Shinkansen.

Platforms

History
Urasa Station opened on 1 September 1923. Shinkansen operations commenced from 15 November 1982. Upon the privatization of the Japanese National Railways (JNR) on 1 April 1987, it came under the control of JR East.

Passenger statistics
In fiscal 2015, the station was used by an average of 1,444 passengers daily (boarding passengers only).

Surrounding area
 International University of Japan
National Route 17
Urasa Ski Resort

See also
 List of railway stations in Japan

References

External links

 Urasa Station 

Railway stations in Niigata Prefecture
Railway stations in Japan opened in 1923
Stations of East Japan Railway Company
Jōetsu Line
Jōetsu Shinkansen